Marianne Van Hirtum (20 July 1935 – 11 June 1988) was a Belgian author writing in the French language, connected with the surrealist movement. 

She was born in Namur, the daughter of Louis Van Hirtum, a doctor at a psychiatric hospital.

Van Hirtum met André Breton in 1959, the same year in which she participated in the International Surrealist Exhibition in Paris. She died in Paris, aged 52.

Bibliography
 Poèmes pour les petits pauvres, Paris, Seghers 1953.
 Les Insolites, Paris, Gallimard 1956.
 La Nuit mathématique, Mortemart, Rougerie 1976.
 Les Balançoires d'Euclide, Mortemart, Rougerie 1977.
 Maisons, Parisod 1977.
 Le Cheval-arquebuse, Orléans, Jean-Jacques Sergent 1978.
 Le Trépied des algèbres, Mortemart, Rougerie 1980.
 Le Papillon mental, Mortemart, Rougerie 1982.
 John the Pelican, Hourglass, 1990.
 Proteus volens, Hourglass 1991.
 Peintures, dessins, objets, Hourglass 1991.

References

 Marianne van Hirtum (French)

1935 births
1988 deaths
French surrealist writers
Belgian writers in French
20th-century Belgian women writers